Lyman Smith may refer to:

 Lyman Bradford Smith (1904–1997), American botanist
 Lyman Smith (American football) (born 1956), American football defensive tackle
 Lyman Cornelius Smith (1850–1910), American innovator and industrialist